In religion, a truth claim is an assertion that the belief system holds to be true; however, from the existence of an assertion that the belief system holds to be true, it does not follow that the assertion is true. For example, a truth claim in Judaism is that only one God exists. Conflicting truth claims between different religions can be a cause of religious conflict. The theory of truth claims has been advanced by John Hick.

See also
Religious views on truth

Sources

Epistemology of religion